A declaration of independence, declaration of statehood or proclamation of independence is an assertion by a polity in a defined territory that it is independent and constitutes a state. Such places are usually declared from part or all of the territory of another state or failed state, or are breakaway territories from within the larger state. In 2010, the UN's International Court of Justice ruled in an advisory opinion in Kosovo that "International law contains no prohibition on declarations of independence", though the state from which the territory wishes to secede may regard the declaration as rebellion, which may lead to a war of independence or a constitutional settlement to resolve the crisis.

List of declarations of independence

See also
 Independence referendum
 List of national independence days
 List of sovereign states by date of formation
 Political history of the world
 Separatism
 Unilateral declaration of independence

Explanatory notes

References

External links